The World in a Sea Shell is the third album by Strawberry Alarm Clock, released in November 1968 on the Uni label. The album was not a chart success, and was the final LP to include the classic Strawberry Alarm Clock lineup.

Background
When the band's second album, Wake Up...It's Tomorrow, failed to recapture the huge success of 1967's Incense and Peppermints, the band's management decided to exert more control over the recordings for the third album. To this end, they pressured the band to record several compositions written by outsiders, including Carole King and "Incense and Peppermints" lyricists John Carter and Tim Gilbert. The band members bristled at this situation, but reluctantly agreed to it in the end. Thus, five of the album's 12 songs (including most of side 1 of the vinyl LP) were non-SAC songs.

The new direction did not pay off commercially for the band. Many of the tracks on The World in a Sea Shell featured lush orchestration and a gentle, escapist feel that stood in stark contrast to the adventurous psychedelia of the band's past work. This sudden change in direction, seen as a gross miscalculation on their managers' part by the band members, helped seal Strawberry Alarm Clock's fate. This frustrated the band, as their own compositions for this album included some adventurous moments and sound collages that fans might have expected and that weren't too far removed from the style of the previous albums.

Track listing

Side 1

 "Sea Shell" (John Carter, Tim Gilbert)
 "Blues for a Young Girl Gone" (Carole King, Toni Stern)
 "An Angry Young Man" (Bob Stone)
 "A Million Smiles Away" (Lee Freeman, Ed King)
 "Home Sweet Home" (John Carter, Tim Gilbert)
 "Lady of the Lake" (Carole King, Toni Stern)

Side 2

 "Barefoot in Baltimore" (Roy Freeman, Ed King, Mark Weitz)
 "Wooden Woman" (Lee Freeman)
 "Heated Love" (George Bunnell, Randy Seol)
 "Love Me Again" (Lee Freeman, Ed King)
 "Eulogy" (George Bunnell, Roy Freeman, Randy Seol)
 "Shallow Impressions" (Mark Weitz)

Japanese CD bonus track

 "Barefoot in Baltimore" (single version)

Singles from the album
Two singles were released, "Sea Shell" (which didn't chart in the US; No. 88 in Canada) and "Barefoot in Baltimore" (which reached No. 67 in the US charts during the summer of 1968, and No. 45 in Canada). The latter was especially popular on local radio stations in its namesake city of Baltimore, Maryland and was used as a theme song for the city for decades afterwards.

Aftermath
In the wake of the album's release, original members George Bunnell and Randy Seol departed, with the lineup on the band's final album Good Morning Starshine consisting of guitarists Lee Freeman and Ed King augmented by Nightcrawlers singer Jimmy Pitman, and previous drummer Gene Gunnels.

Personnel
George Bunnell – bass guitar, vocals
Randy Seol – drums, keyboards, percussion, vocals
Lee Freeman – rhythm guitar, sitar, vocals
Ed King – guitar, vocals
Mark Weitz – keyboards, vocals

Additional personnel
George Tipton - arrangements
Howard Davis - vocal arrangements
Technical
Paul Buff - engineer
Don Weller - cover illustration

References

1968 albums
Strawberry Alarm Clock albums
Uni Records albums
Albums arranged by George Tipton